The 1976 Belgian motorcycle Grand Prix was the seventh round of the 1976 Grand Prix motorcycle racing season. It took place on 4 July 1976 at the Circuit de Spa-Francorchamps.

500cc classification

250 cc classification

125 cc classification

50 cc classification

Sidecar classification

References

Belgian motorcycle Grand Prix
Belgian
Motorcycle Grand Prix